Shahid Akhand (born 1935), is a Bangladeshi author and novelist of Bengali literature.

Biography 
He began writing in the second decade after the Partition of Bengal (1947). His novel Panna  Holo  Sobuj depicted urban middle-class life.

In 1978, he won a Bangla Academy Literary Award for a short story. In 2008, a play adapted from his novel Bhetorer Manush was screened on Bangladesh Television.

He lives in Bangladesh, and has been blind for a few years. He has three daughters and a son.

Works

Novels
Panna  Holo  Sobuj  (Emerald Green, 1964)
Pakhir Gaan Boner Chhaya (Bird Songs Forest Shades, 1970)
Dudondo Shanti (Moments of Peace, 1971)
Ekoda Ek Bosonte (Once in Spring Time, 1984)
Shei Pakhi (That Bird  1986)
Apon Sourav  (Own Fragrance  1986)
Kokhon Ke Jane (Who Knows When, 1995)
Bhetorer Manush

References 

Bangladeshi male writers
Bengali writers
Bengali-language writers
1935 births
Living people